is a Japanese jazz pianist and composer.

Early life
Shiina was born in Tokyo on 23 September 1964. He had piano lessons from the age of three. From 1982 he studied composition at the Kunitachi College of Music; while still a student, he became a professional jazz pianist.

Later life and career
Shiina joined the bands of Lionel Hampton and Vincent Herring for their 1989 tours of Japan. In the following year he became part of Roy Hargrove's quartet. Shiina was a founding member of the Jazz Networks, and led this band from 1992. He formed his own trio in 1994, initially with bassist Reginald Veal and drummer Masahiko Osaka. This band recorded, as did later versions that contained Veal and Herlin Riley, then Christian McBride and Clarence Penn.

In 1996 the pianist toured Japan with trumpeter Duško Gojković and Europe with drummer Elvin Jones' Jazz Machine. In 2007 Shiina co-led a tour of the UK with trumpeter Damon Brown. The two played together in the UK again, under the leadership of Brown and saxophonist Steve Grossman, in 2012.

Playing style
John Fordham of The Guardian compared Shiina with pianist Wynton Kelly and commented that Shiina "keeps his virtuosity throttled back and maintains a hip expressiveness by letting insinuations, nuances and implied swing, and the subtle tick of the rhythm section do much of the work."

Discography
An asterisk (*) after the year indicates that it is the year of release.

As leader/co-leader

As sideman

References

Bibliography

1964 births
Japanese jazz pianists
Living people
Musicians from Tokyo
21st-century pianists